Felix Wiedwald (born 15 March 1990) is a German former professional footballer who played as a goalkeeper. A Werder Bremen youth product, he played for the club's reserves in the 3. Liga before moving to 2. Bundesliga club MSV Duisburg in 2011. Following a two-year stint at Bundesliga side Eintracht Frankfurt he returned to Werder Bremen in 2015. Upon Jiří Pavlenka's arrival in 2017, he moved to Championship club Leeds United where he spent one season before rejoining Eintracht Frankfurt. At Eintracht Frankfurt he featured sparingly and was loaned out to former club [MSV Duisburg. He retired after stints with Dutch club FC Emmen in the Eredivisie and with 2. Bundesliga side SV Sandhausen. At international level, he made one appearance for the Germany U20 national team.

Club career

Early career
After progressing through the academy of TSV Achim and subsequently Werder Bremen, Wiedwald made his debut for Werder Bremen II in the 2–2 away game at FC Carl Zeiss Jena in the 3. Liga on 26 September 2009. He became Werder Bremen II's first-choice goalkeeper.

MSV Duisburg
After joining Duisburg initially as number 2 goalkeeper to Florian Fromlowitz, Wiedwald played his first 2. Bundesliga match for MSV Duisburg on 18 November 2011 in a 3–0 home win against Eintracht Braunschweig.

Eintracht Frankfurt
In the summer of 2013, Wiedwald joined Bundesliga club Eintracht Frankfurt, where he became the number two goalkeeper to regular goalkeeper Kevin Trapp. On 12 December 2013, he made his debut for Eintracht Frankfurt in the UEFA Europa League match against Apoel Nicosia.

Wiedwald made his debut in the Bundesliga on 2 February 2014, when he came on in the game against Bayern Munich for the injured Kevin Trapp. In September 2014, he held off competition from experienced former German international goalkeeper Timo Hildebrand to be the club's temporary first choice goalkeeper after an injury to regular number one Kevin Trapp.

Werder Bremen

On 26 May 2015, Werder Bremen announced their signing of Wiedwald as he returned to his childhood club after spending four years at other clubs. While Raphael Wolf, his main competitor, struggled with injuries Wiedwald went into the 2015–16 season as Werder's first choice goalkeeper.

At the beginning of the 2016–17 season, Wiedwald shared the number one position with Jaroslav Drobny, however established himself in the second half of the season, with Wiedwald starting 26 games for Bremen over the season as they finished 8th in the Bundesliga. After impressing during the latter half of the season and reaching a clause after playing 20+ games, on 11 May 2017, Wiedwald's contract at the club was automatically extended.

After Bremen signed goalkeeper Jiří Pavlenka on 27 June 2017 as the new number one goalkeeper for the 2017–18 season, Wiedwald was subject of enquiries from Ligue 1 club FC Nantes and Championship club Leeds United.

Leeds United
On 30 June 2017, Wiedwald signed for Leeds United of the Championship on a three-year deal contract an undisclosed fee. On 6 August 2017, the first matchday of the 2017–18 season, he made his Leeds United debut in the 3–2 victory against Bolton Wanderers. In the following three league matches on 12, 15, and 19 August he kept four successive clean sheets – in two 0–0 draws against Preston North End and Fulham, in a 2–0 victory against Sunderland and a 2–0 victory against Nottingham Forest on 26 August.

After receiving criticism for his performance against Sheffield Wednesday, Wiedwald lost his place in the side to Andy Lonergan. However, with Lonergan having several games as number 1 and failing to impress, Wiedwald returned to the side against Barnsley on 25 November keeping a clean sheet. During the game, a quick thinking Leeds fan from the crowd gave him his cap when he noticed that the sun was interfering with his vision. After the game, Wiedwald gave the fan his cap back and also his shirt as a thank you gift. He made an error on 9 December against Queens Park Rangers when he let Paweł Wszołek's hopeful tame long ball bounce into the net.

He kept his 10th clean sheet of the season in his 19th performance on 1 January 2018 in Leeds 0–0 draw against Nottingham Forest. He received the man of the match award for Leeds, after keeping another clean sheet in Leeds 0–0 draw against Hull City on 31 January.

After an early error against Bristol City that led to a goal, Wiedwald was criticised both by fans and by former Leeds and England goalkeeper Paul Robinson, acting as Sky Sports pundit, who said he thought Leeds needed another goalkeeper.

On 24 February 2018, he helped prove to be a match winner in Leeds' 1–0 win against Brentford, when he made a save from Brentford's John Egan. On 2 March, Wiedwald again came under criticism in a 3–0 defeat against Middlesbrough after a series of errors in the game including letting a Patrick Bamford shot squirm past him to score Boro's second goal of the game. On 7 March, he was dropped due to his form, with youngster Bailey Peacock-Farrell preferred in goal against league leaders Wolverhampton Wanderers. Leeds lost 3–0 but Peacock-Farrell received man of the match for his display.

Eintracht Frankfurt
Wiedwald re-signed for Bundesliga club Eintracht Frankfurt on 19 June 2018 on a three-year contract for an undisclosed fee. He joined MSV Duisburg on 2 January 2019 on loan until the end of the 2018–19 season.

FC Emmen
Wiedwald moved to Eredivisie side FC Emmen on 5 October 2020, the last day of the 2020 summer transfer window. He signed a one-year contract with the option of a second year.

SV Sandhausen
In January 2022, after half a year without a club, Wiedwald signed a contract until the end of the 2021–22 season with 2. Bundesliga club SV Sandhausen. He joined as a replacement for the injured Nikolai Rehnen.

Retirement
Wiedwald announced his retirement in September 2022.

International career
On 13 November 2009, Wiedwald made his debut for the Germany U20 national team against Austria U20.

Career statistics

References

External links

1990 births
Living people
Footballers from Lower Saxony
German footballers
Association football goalkeepers
SV Werder Bremen players
SV Werder Bremen II players
MSV Duisburg players
Eintracht Frankfurt players
Eintracht Frankfurt II players
Leeds United F.C. players
FC Emmen players
SV Sandhausen players
Bundesliga players
2. Bundesliga players
3. Liga players
Regionalliga players
English Football League players
Eredivisie players
Germany youth international footballers
German expatriate footballers
German expatriate sportspeople in England
Expatriate footballers in England
German expatriate sportspeople in the Netherlands
Expatriate footballers in the Netherlands